André Luiz Brügger de Mello Rodrigues, or  Manteguinha  (born 2 April 1981) is a Brazilian retired professional basketball player, who plays in the Novo Basquete Brasil league in Brazil. Manteguinha was born in Rio de Janeiro, and has played for many teams in Rio and around Brazil.

Previous Teams
Flamengo (RJ)
Tijuca Tênis Clube (RJ)
Clube Municipal (RJ)
Vasco da Gama (RJ)
Ajax (GO)
Uberlândia (MG)

Araldite/Univille
Manteguinha is the starting shooting guard for Joinville's NBB team, and is usually the top scorer on the team. In the edition of the Novo Basquete Brasil league (2008–2009), Manteguinha led Joinville to a 4th place overall finish, losing on the semifinals to the future champion Flamengo Basketball.

NBB Stats

Regular season

|-
| style="text-align:left;"| 
| style="text-align:left;"| Joinville
| 29 || 29 || 34.1 || .543 || bgcolor=lightblue | .485|| .794 || 2.7 || 4.2 || N/A || 0.1 || 17.8
|-
| style="text-align:left;"| 
| style="text-align:left;"| Joinville
| 24 || 24 || 32.0 || .500 || .407 || .868 || 2.42 || 2.75 || 1.25 || 0.3 || 15.2

Playoffs

|-
| style="text-align:left;"| 
| style="text-align:left;"| Joinville
| 7 || 7 || 38.1 || .571 || .554 ||  ||  || 5.6 ||  ||  || 20.7
|-

References

1981 births
Living people
Club Athletico Paulistano basketball players
Novo Basquete Brasil players
Point guards